Jake Arnold may refer to:
 Jake Arnold (athlete) (born 1984), American decathlete
 Jake Arnold (interior designer), British, Los Angeles-based celebrity interior designer